Hector Hugo Balderas Jr. (born August 16, 1973) is an American lawyer and former prosecutor who served as the attorney general of New Mexico from 2015 to 2023. In 2006, Balderas became the youngest statewide Hispanic elected official in the nation when he won his first race for New Mexico state auditor at the age of 33. Before that Balderas served as a State Representative in the New Mexico Legislature from 2004 to 2006. Balderas also serves as the elected treasurer of the National Association of Latino Elected Officials.

In an article published November 17, 2014, Balderas was identified as one of seven Democratic state executive officials who could gain national prominence by leading the party to a national comeback.

Steve Terrell of The Santa Fe New Mexican wrote on May 16, 2015 that Balderas, who won his attorney-general race, was the only Hispanic on the statewide Democratic ticket in 2014. He was the top vote-getter of all statewide candidates that year, winning 1,565 more votes than Governor Susana Martinez.

Early life and education
Balderas was raised in Wagon Mound, New Mexico, a village in Mora County, New Mexico. He is the son of a Mexican father and was raised by his single mother. Balderas attended Wagon Mound High School and participated in TRIO Upward Bound, a federally funded college prep program.

While attending the University of New Mexico School of Law, Balderas served as the council chair of the Graduate and Professional Student Association.

Career
From 2002 to 2003 Balderas served as an assistant district attorney for Bernalillo County. Between 2003 and 2006 he was a special prosecutor for domestic violence cases in the 4th Judicial District of New Mexico.

New Mexico House of Representatives
Balderas ran for a seat in the New Mexico House of Representatives in 2004, defeating the Democratic incumbent in the primary election and a Republican in the general election.

In May 2006, he traveled to Pakistan to support President Bush's war on terror, and discussed foreign policy and United States-Pakistan relations on a top Pakistani talk show.

In his first term, Balderas passed sweeping legislation to strengthen penalties for sexual predators, worked to strengthen drug laws against methamphetamine and date rape drugs, established investment incentives for clean energy and funded virtual education for rural public schools. Balderas also sponsored "truthful interrogations" legislation which gained national recognition as one of the most significant reforms to the criminal justice system. Balderas was nationally recognized alongside then-State Senator Barack Obama of Illinois for passing legislation that requires police to record their in-house interrogations with suspected killers.

In recognition of his legislative accomplishments, Balderas was named Rookie-Leader-of-the-Year by the Greater Albuquerque Chamber of Commerce for his work on energy development and Outstanding Rookie by the League of Conservation Voters.

State auditor
During his first legislative term, he was chosen by the Democratic Party of New Mexico to replace Jeff Armijo on the ballot for state auditor and with a shorter period to campaign, won the election with nearly 55% of the vote. He was re-elected in 2010 and earned the second-highest number of votes of any of New Mexico's Democratic statewide candidates.

U.S. Senate campaign

Balderas was a candidate for the U.S. Senate seat in 2012 held by retiring Democrat Jeff Bingaman. He lost the Democratic primary to Martin Heinrich.

Attorney general
Balderas was elected as the attorney general of New Mexico in 2014.

Other positions
 Treasurer Board Member, National Association of Latino Elected and Appointed Officials (NALEO). NALEO is a national nonpartisan organization with a network of more than 6,000 governmental, political, and business leaders who conduct civic projects, training and technical assistance for the Latino community. There are 24 members on the board of directors.

Honors and accolades

 Recipient of the 2011 Conservation Voters New Mexico Sunshine Award. Balderas was recognized for his steadfast work as State Auditor in rooting out fraud and corruption, and shining sunlight on the operations of state government. According to CVNM, his hard work has resulted in millions of dollars of savings and the enforcement of key safeguards that protect New Mexico's natural resources.
 Recipient of the 2010 recipient John F. Kennedy New Frontier Award, which honors young Americans who are changing their community through a commitment to public service. He is the first New Mexican to receive the annual award. The award is presented annually to exceptional young Americans under the age of 40 whose contributions in elective office, community service or advocacy demonstrate the impact and value of public service in the spirit of John F. Kennedy.
 Recognized by Hispanic Business Magazine in 2007 as one of the nation's 100 most influential Hispanics. Balderas joined 2007 honorees including Eastman Kodak Company CEO and Chairman Antonio M. Perez, former U.S. Commerce Secretary Carlos Gutierrez and Hillary Clinton for President Campaign Manager Patti Solis Doyle.
 New Mexico State Bar Association 2006 Outstanding Young Lawyer Award.
 In 2010, Hector Balderas was awarded the Liberty and Justice Award by the New Mexico Hispanic Bar Association for his contributions to empowerment for Hispanics in education and the legal profession.

Personal life 
Balderas and his wife Denise have three children. Balderas is a special needs advocate and frequent participant in the New Mexico Special Olympics annual torch run; his daughter Arianna was born with Down syndrome.

Electoral history

References

External links

Government website
Campaign website

|-

1973 births
21st-century American politicians
American politicians of Mexican descent
Living people
Democratic Party members of the New Mexico House of Representatives
New Mexico Attorneys General
New Mexico Highlands University alumni
People from Mora County, New Mexico
State auditors of New Mexico
University of New Mexico School of Law alumni